Tamara Armoush (born 8 May 1992) is a British-born middle-distance runner who now competes for Jordan. She competed in the women's 1500 metres at the 2017 World Championships in Athletics.

References

External links

1992 births
Living people
British female middle-distance runners
Jordanian female middle-distance runners
World Athletics Championships athletes for Jordan
Athletes (track and field) at the 2018 Asian Games
Asian Games competitors for Jordan